Spiritual Unity is a studio album by American free jazz saxophonist Albert Ayler. It was recorded on July 10, 1964 in New York City, and features bassist Gary Peacock and drummer Sunny Murray. It was the first album recorded for Bernard Stollman's ESP-Disk label, and it brought Ayler to international attention as it was so "shockingly different". At the same time, it transformed ESP-DISK into "a major source for avant-garde jazz". A 5-star review in AllMusic called it a "landmark recording that's essential to any basic understanding of free jazz", "the album that pushed Albert Ayler to the forefront of jazz's avant-garde... really the first available document of Ayler's music that matched him with a group of truly sympathetic musicians", and stated that "the results are a magnificently pure distillation of his aesthetic."

Background
In late December 1963, Bernard Stollman, who had been toying with the idea of starting a record label, went, at the insistence of a friend, to hear Ayler at the Baby Grand Café on 125th Street in Harlem. Ayler had moved to New York City earlier in the year, and had recently been playing with a variety of musicians, including Ornette Coleman, with whom Ayler made an informal recording earlier that month, and Cecil Taylor, with whom he would perform on New Years Eve on a concert at Philharmonic Hall, Lincoln Center that would also feature the John Coltrane quintet and Art Blakey and the Jazz Messengers. According to Stollman, upon arriving at the Baby Grand Cafe,

Elmo Hope was at the piano, with his trio, on an elevated stage. I sat and listened to them. Several minutes later, a small man in a gray leather suit, holding a large saxophone, brushed by me and jumped up on the stage. He had a black beard, with a little patch of white in it. He was not introduced and, ignoring the trio, he began to blow his horn. The other musicians stopped and looked at him. No words were exchanged. Elmo Hope quietly closed his piano, the bass player parked his bass, the drummer put his sticks down, and they all sat back to listen. He was playing solo, and he kept right on playing for twenty to thirty minutes, just a burst of music. It seemed like a second; it was no time at all! Then he stopped and jumped down from the platform, covered with sweat.

Stollman then approached Ayler, told him he was starting a record label, and asked him to be his first artist, offering a $500 advance. Ayler agreed, and stated that he would contact Stollman after fulfulling a commitment to record material at Atlantic Studios. (Here he was referring to the February 24, 1964 session that yielded two albums, Spirits, later reissued as Witches & Devils, and Swing Low Sweet Spiritual.)

In early 1964, Ayler briefly joined a quartet led by Paul Bley. This occasion introduced Ayler to bassist Gary Peacock, who had been playing with Bley for several years, and who had also recently recorded with Bill Evans. Bley's group also included drummer Sunny Murray, with whom Ayler had played in Cecil Taylor's group. (Murray was featured on both of Ayler's February 24 recordings.) The Bley quartet did not record, and made only one public appearance at the Take 3 coffeehouse in Greenwich Village. By late spring, Ayler, Peacock, and Murray had formed a trio, after Peacock left Miles Davis' group, where he was substituting for Ron Carter. On June 14, the trio played at the Cellar Café in New York City and recorded the material that would be released on the album Prophecy, which features some of the pieces that would be recorded for Spiritual Unity less than a month later.

Recording and release
That same month, Ayler called Stollman and told him he would like to make a recording. According to Val Wilmer, Ayler's decision to join Stollman's label, which would be called ESP-Disk, was made "against the advice of Cecil Taylor and other musicians who thought that artists should hold out for a price commensurate with their talent." Ayler justified his decision, stating: "I felt my art was so important that I had to get it out. At that time I was musically out of this world. I knew I had to play this music for the people."

Stollman booked a session for July 10 at Variety Arts Studio, a small and inexpensive studio near Times Square which had been used frequently by Moe Asch, the owner of Folkways Records, for whom Stollman had done legal work. Stollman recalled:

Just before 1 PM, Sunny Murray arrived, a large, genial walrus, moving and speaking with an easy agility that belied his appearance. Gary Peacock was next, tall, thin, ascetic looking, and soft spoken, with an introspective and kindly demeanor. Albert Ayler was last, small, wary and laconic.

The recording engineer left the studio door open, and Stollman and Peacock's then-wife Annette sat in the reception area. According to Stollman,

As the music played, I was enthralled, exhilarated, jubilant. I exchanged glances with Annette and said, "What an auspicious beginning for a record label!" She nodded her head in agreement.

At one point, "the engineer fled the control room for a few minutes, but returned in time to change the tape for the next selection". Although the session was well-miked, Stollman was "horrified" to learn that it had been recorded monaurally. However, years later he stated: "In forty-plus years, no one has ever cared". The musicians were paid and signed recording agreements after the session, in a nearby cafe.

Stollman hired Jordan Matthews, formerly a producer for ABC, as his art director, and Matthews brought in Howard Bernstein to do the cover art. Stollman stated that he decided to silk-screen the cover, lending it "a primal quality, suitable for ESP". Despite the fact that it was the first true ESP-Disk recording, Spiritual Unity was released in 1965 as the second item in the label's catalog, following a record titled Ni Kantu En Esperanto, which Stollman described as "just an exercise" resulting from his interest in Esperanto. (Stollman recalled that when he recorded the Esperanto album, he "had no thoughts of doing anything beyond that".)

Early releases of Spiritual Unity contained a booklet titled "Ayler - Peacock - Murray - You and the Night and the Music" with text by Paul Haines. The album liner notes state that the symbol "Y" that appears on the back cover "pre-dates recorded history and has always represented the rising spirit of man. We thought the sign particularly apt for this album." The booklet has never been included in any CD reissue, but it was included in the "Holy Ghost" box set.

Ayler was pleased with the recording, and felt that it represented a very high level of musical interaction, stating: "Most people would have thought this impossible but it actually happened. The most important thing is to stay in tune with each other but it takes spiritual people to do this... We weren't playing, we were listening to each other." Following its release, Ayler sent a copy of the album to John Coltrane, and soon afterwards, Coltrane urged Impulse! Records to sign Ayler. In June 1965, Coltrane recorded the album Ascension; following the recording session, Coltrane "called Ayler and told him, 'I recorded an album and found that I was playing just like you.' Albert's reply: 'No man, don't you see, you were playing like yourself. You were just feeling what I feel and were just crying out for spiritual unity."

Stollman was energized by the experience, and recalled: "I was thrilled with that record, so I was very much charged up with the idea of going forward. I wanted to explore this new music." A week following the Spiritual Unity session, Ayler, Peacock, and Murray, along with Don Cherry, John Tchicai, and Roswell Rudd, recorded New York Eye and Ear Control, which would also be released by ESP-Disk. The label would issue several additional Ayler albums, including Bells and Spirits Rejoice. According to Stollman, following Ayler's death in 1970, he represented the musician's estate.

Critical reception

Initial critical reaction to Spiritual Unity was mixed. Scott Deveaux and Gary Giddins observed that the album "was both cheered and ridiculed", and stated that "Ayler's huge sound evoked lusty hysteria". In July 1965, DownBeat published an article which featured a negative, zero-star review by Kenny Dorham, who wrote that the album is "not worth the paper it takes to review it. Too far out. He passed the moon and the stars", alongside a positive review by Bill Mathieu, who wrote: "Notes disappear into wide, irregular ribbons, fragmented, prismatic, wind-blown, undetermined, and filled with fury. Though the fury is frightening, dangerous, it achieves absolute certainty through being, musically, absolutely contained... Ayler seemingly rarely hears one note at a time—as if it were useless ever to consider the particles of a thing. He seems to want to scan all notes at all times and in this way speak to an expanded consciousness. And the consistency in this outpouring is a reference point from which his music takes shape... Ayler's music, as well as most avant-garde music, is, at best, difficult to listen to. It is nevertheless a very direct statement, the physical manifestation of a spiritual or mystical ritual. Its logic is the logic of human flesh in the sphere of the spirit. Could it be that ritual is more accessible to some listeners than it is to others?"

Recent reaction has been more positive. The authors of The Penguin Guide to Jazz selected the album as part of their suggested "Core Collection," awarding it a "crown" in addition to a four-star rating, and commenting: "the 1964 Ayler trio was quintessentially a listening band, locked in a personal struggle which it is possible only to observe, awestruck, from the sidelines." In 2013, Spin included it on the "Top 100 Alternative Albums of the 1960s" list. In 2017, Pitchfork placed it at number 30 on the "200 Best Albums of the 1960s" list.

Val Wilmer wrote that Spiritual Unity "revolutionised the direction for anyone playing those three instruments. The music was shockingly different - Ayler disquietingly harsh and brutal but at the same time deeply tinged with pathos, Peacock listening as he played monumental bass figures, Murray behaving, as LeRoi Jones once put it, as though 'he might just want to disappear' - but its conclusions seemed so simple when you listened to it. Ayler, Murray and Peacock had created the perfect group music." According to John Corbett, Spiritual Unity represents "one of the most radical moments" in an "alternative way of thinking" where instrumentalists ask: "What is my supposed role, and what if I don't want to live by it?" He wrote: "The saxophone and bass and drums are doing something quite different from what they normally do—the bassist... is melodic, skittish, and virtuosic; the drummer... gathers pools and eddies of sound, mounting and dissipating volume, his cymbals awash in nervous energy; the saxophonist... only plays a smidge of melodic material, concentrating on ecstatic shouts and cries, swooping across the others in big slurs  and swipes, lightning flashing across a turbulent sea. The conventional roles of the instruments are upended, reinvented." Corbett went on to compare the experience to "driving an automobile in which the relationships between the parts of the motor are repeatedly reinvented."

Ted Gioia called Spiritual Unity "a major statement, the most cohesive ensemble project the saxophonist had undertaken to date", in which "Ayler showed that his radical remaking of the jazz saxophone vocabulary was largely self-sufficient, needing no other horns to set it off or support its blistering attack. It encompassed fervent explorations of harmonics, haunting stringlike evocations in the higher register, and Vesuvian explosions of sonic lava. Peacock and Murray hold onto these energized lines with the determination of cowpokes latching onto steers at the rodeo. To their credit, they grapple masterfully with Ayler's unpredictable leaps and turns." The authors of The Penguin Jazz Guide described Ayler's trio as "quintessentially a listening band, locked in a personal struggle which it is possible only to observe, awestruck, from the side-lines", and, having noted that Ayler had recorded traditional material on Swing Low Sweet Spiritual earlier that year, wrote: "Heard in that context, it is impossible to consider Spiritual Unity as anything other than an extension of vernacular themes, played in an ecstatic manner typical of the African-American churches. Brief as it is, it remains a record of immitigable power and authority, but there is humour under the surface and a humanity that is rarely acknowledged."

Saxophonist Shabaka Hutchings, leader of the band Sons of Kemet, wrote that the first time he listened to Spiritual Unity, he "didn't understand anything!... My brain couldn't compute it." He commented: "this was untranscribable – it seemed like there was nothing to steal from it. It sounded like he was crying through the saxophone. You can hear vocalisation in Sidney Bechet and the older guys, but this was the first time I'd heard someone follow through on that and not try to mesh it with something more conventional". Eventually, he stated, "The more I listened, the more I realised that it's in what Anthony Braxton calls 'an emotional zone' – whatever Ayler does, it's about the emotional intent behind it. I wanted to see whether I could get into that space where you're free to do that. It's all about the big picture – more like painting."

Mark Richardson wrote that Ayler had a "telepathic empathy" with Peacock and Murray on Spiritual Unity, and stated: "Together Peacock and Murray form a sound backing that at times seems more like an endlessly shifting cluster of sound than an actual rhythm section. Murray has a light, rapid touch, keeping the cymbals and snares going pretty much constantly, never breaking the flow of the music with a heavy roll, and Peacock functions as an extension of his textures." He concluded by calling the album "short... intense, and a deserved classic." John Fordham, writing in The Guardian, commented: "Half a century since the trio unleashed this music in a tiny Times Square studio, it still blazes, uplifts and unnerves. Ayler emerges from a Sonny Rollins-like jauntiness into slurred-pitch flurries and klaxon hoots over Peacock's prodding lines and Murray's shadings on the opening 'Ghosts'; barges ferociously through seamless runs on 'The Wizard'; and calls imploringly in a tone somewhere between an impassioned singer and a microtonal viola player on the meditative 'Spirits'. It still sounds like music on the edge".

In a review for All About Jazz, Mark Corroto called the album "30 minutes that changed the direction of jazz", and wrote: "Fifty years after the recording of Albert Ayler's Spiritual Unity, the music (and the man) are still causing tumult. It is not so much that free jazz hasn't been on our radar these past decades, it's just that this recording remains one of those 'where were you, when you first heard it?' experiences." He continued: "Bassist Gary Peacock... doesn't so much keep time as feed the fires of Ayler's free folk jazz playing. Peacock bridged from his work with pianists Bill Evans and Paul Bley into this open expression with Ayler. Hearing him bow lines on 'Spirits' or pull energy bombs on 'Ghosts' is akin to watching a boxer working out on a speed bag. The same holds true for drummer Sunny Murray who eschews the presumptions of pulse for accent. His cymbal work sizzles throughout... Ayler's marches, his folk-jazz and New Orleans brass sound was (is) an audacious and indomitable approach to music making that was both revolutionary and an 'ah-ha' moment in the development of free jazz of the 1960s that still resonates loudly today".

Ayler biographer Jeff Schwartz stated: "The music recorded at this session is simply incredible... All three members are constantly improvising freely. It is only convention that makes one hear a saxophone accompanied by bass and drums. In fact, while there is quite a bit of brilliant interaction between the players, it is much more helpful to view the pieces recorded by the Ayler trio as sets of simultaneous solos. Never before (or maybe since) had an ensemble taken the New Orleans ideal of collective improvisation to such an extreme level." Regarding Ayler's tone, Schwartz wrote: "No jazz player had ever used a vibrato as wide as Ayler's and it is primarily the melodrama of this sound that led critics to describe him as primitive. In this crying, braying oscillation of pitch is perhaps Ayler's greatest break with jazz tradition. It is as if he is refusing to be 'hip,' to hide his feelings, to be 'cool,' like the vibratoless Paul Desmond and Lee Konitz. He has gone beyond the vocalized vibrato of players like Louis Armstrong to what can only be described as sobbing." Writer Ekkehard Jost noted that "Ayler's negation of fixed pitches finds a counterpart in Peacock's and Murray's negation of the beat. In no group of this time is so little heard of a steady beat... The absolute rhythmic freedom frequently leads to action on three independent rhythmic planes: Ayler improvises in long drawn-out sound-spans; Peacock hints at chains of impulses, irregular and yet swinging in a remote sense; Murray plays on cymbals with a very live resonance, creating colour rather than accentuation."

Music critic S. Victor Aaron wrote: "Jazz began as Buddy Bolden's ragtime inspired by former slaves performing in New Orleans' Congo Square during the latter years of the nineteenth century. Somehow it ended up some seventy years later in a studio just off of New York's Times Square. That's when and where Albert Ayler and his trio recorded Spiritual Unity on one summer day in 1964... it was apparent that the maverick saxophonist Albert Ayler walked into that studio fifty years ago last week to bring jazz to the terminus point in its trajectory of development." He continued: "this record was well ahead of the frontier of jazz. And still today, there's not much out there that is truly 'out there' as Spiritual Unity. There are scant few among those that possess its uncanny focus and unified purpose... To go way forward in music, you have to go back fifty years."

In a review, writer Jackson Brown stated: "Albert Ayler's Spiritual Unity is a confluence of divergent paths stretching back as far as our species can trace, as far as man's first experiments with giving force a form in the manner of sound... It is not the mere representation of the thing that Ayler achieves here, but the recontextualization, the liberation of the American musical tradition. The result is otherworldly... Ayler desired to dispense with the constraints of musical notes and conventional composition. In its place, he sought the sound in between notes and the expression of his instrument as a primal force, an extension of himself in which to explore a unique timbre, improvising in both high and low registers with squeaks, honks, blasts: bursts of passion them all". Regarding the trio, he wrote: "the amount of understanding this group has for each other's tendencies and creative pursuits is staggering, nigh telepathic... the entire album is three separate 'solos,' each one building off of the other. The group feels less like three different musicians and more like a unified, spiritual organism in communion with itself". He concluded: "Albert Ayler drew on the disparate musics of the American tradition and boldly forged his own path through the flames, inspiring some of the most inspirational figures in jazz and shaping the future of avant-garde music to come. He will not be forgotten, or forgiven, for that".

Track listing

Personnel
Credits adapted from liner notes.

 Albert Ayler – tenor saxophone
 Gary Peacock – double bass
 Sunny Murray – percussion

References

External links
 

1964 albums
Albert Ayler albums
ESP-Disk albums
Free jazz albums